Eric Austin Litman (born August 1, 1973) is an American entrepreneur and angel investor, and currently serves as CEO of the robotics health technology company, aescape, inc. Litman co-founded Proxicom, built Viaduct from a one-man shop through a merger with the Wolf Group, and was the founder and CEO of Medialets, a mobile ad serving and advertising analytics company acquired by WPP plc.

He has been profiled and quoted by The Wall Street Journal, Forbes, Wired, and Fast Company, was named a 2010 Game Changer by New York Enterprise Report, and in 2011 was called one of the "best operators in online advertising" by TechCrunch

Early life and education 

Litman was born in Los Angeles, California, and grew up on the island of Saint Thomas, U.S. Virgin Islands, where he graduated high school at 15. Litman attended the University of Maryland, College Park.

Career

Starting out in business 

While in college, he worked in pre-sales support and engineering at NeXT, the start-up founded by Apple CEO Steve Jobs. Litman then went on to serve as a Senior Systems Engineer for Digicon, building secure, distributed networks and applications for the U.S. Department of Defense.

Proxicom 

Litman and three other colleagues from Digicon founded Proxicom in 1991. Proxicom, one of the first-generation Internet professional services agencies, went public on NASDAQ in 1998 and was sold to the global consultancy Dimension Data after a bidding war against Compaq (prior to Compaq's merger with Hewlett-Packard).

Viaduct 

After Proxicom, Litman founded Viaduct Technologies, an interactive agency, and served as its CEO.  Viaduct was acquired by Wolf Group in 2000.  After the acquisition Litman stayed as Viaduct's chief operating officer.

WashingtonVC 

Litman was the Managing Director of WashingtonVC, an early stage venture capital fund in Washington, DC, where he focused on investments in online media, consumer Internet and telecommunications.  He conceptualized and launched Aux Interactive in March, 2008.  He left WashingtonVC in May, 2008.

Medialets 
Litman founded Medialets, a mobile ad serving, attribution and measurement provider in 2008. In April, 2015, Medialets was acquired by WPP plc,  the world's largest advertising company, where he served as Senior Vice President of Mobile Worldwide until April of 2017.

aescape 
In May of 2017, Litman founded aescape, inc., a robotics health technology company focused on "helping bodies live better, longer", which counts as investors Peter Wurman, the co-founder of Kiva Systems (now Amazon Robotics), Fabrice Grinda of FJ Labs, Seth Levine and Brad Feld of Foundry Group, NBA championship player Matthew Dellavedova, Shane Feldberg and others.

References

External links 
 Eric Litman's Blog
 New York Times: THE MEDIA BUSINESS: ADVERTISING -- ADDENDA; Wolfe and Omnicom Make Acquisitions
 Washington VC Names Litman Executive Director
 University Venture Summit Starts Students Early on Venture Capital Path
 Shashi Bellamkonda : Meeting a VC in DC - Eric Litman

American technology chief executives
American computer businesspeople
Computer systems engineers
Living people
Businesspeople in software
1973 births